Itaipu Airport  is an airport serving the city of Hernandarias in Alto Paraná Department, Paraguay.

The Itaipu non-directional beacon (ident: ITU) is located on the field. Both the Ciudad del Este vortac (ident: VES) and the Foz Do Iguacu VOR-DME (ident: FOZ) are within  of the airport.

The airline Sol del Paraguay (PI) has plans to start daily (Mon-Fri) flights between Asuncion (ASU) and Itaipu, using a Cessna Grand Caravan 12-seat aircraft. It is hoped to start in August 2018, but this depends on the airport, which needs to make necessary improvements for commercial activities.

See also

 List of airports in Paraguay
 Transport in Paraguay

References

External links
 OpenStreetMap - Itaipu
 OurAirports - Itaipu
 Itaipu
 Skyvector Aeronautical Charts - Itaipu

Airports in Paraguay